PreQ1-II riboswitches form a class of riboswitches that specifically bind pre-queuosine1 (PreQ1), a precursor of the modified nucleoside queuosine.  They are found in certain species of Streptococcus and Lactococcus, and were originally identified as a conserved RNA secondary structure called the "COG4708 motif".  All known members of this riboswitch class appear to control members of COG4708 genes.  These genes are predicted to encode membrane-bound proteins and have been proposed to be a transporter of preQ1, or a related metabolite, based on their association with preQ1-binding riboswitches.  PreQ1-II riboswitches have no apparent similarities in sequence or structure to preQ1-I riboswitches, a previously discovered class of preQ1-binding riboswitches.  PreQ1 thus joins S-adenosylmethionine as the second metabolite to be found that is the ligand of more than one riboswitch class.

References

External links
 

Cis-regulatory RNA elements
Riboswitch